Roy Spence (born October 10, 1948) is the chairman and co-founder of the advertising agency GSD&M, and an author.

Early life
Spence was born in Brownwood, Texas, to Roy Milam Spence Sr. and Ruth Griffin. He attended Brownwood High School, where he was a member of the 1965 Class 3A state championship football team. He then went on to enroll at the University of Texas at Austin, and went on to found GSD&M in 1971.

Awards
In 2004, Roy Spence received the Distinguished Alumnus Award from the University of Texas.

Publications
In 2006, the University of Texas Press published Spence's book The Amazing Faith of Texas.

In 2009, Spence, along with Haley Rushing, authored It's Not What You Sell, It's What You Stand For, a book about purpose-based brand management.

Bibliography

References

1948 births
American business writers
University of Texas at Austin alumni
Living people
American advertising executives
People from Brownwood, Texas